Luca Trevisan (21 July 1971) is an Italian professor of computer science at Bocconi University in Milan.

His research area is theoretical computer science, focusing on randomness, cryptography, probabilistically checkable proofs, approximation, property testing, spectral graph theory, and sublinear algorithms. He also runs a blog, in theory, about theoretical computer science.

Education and career
Trevisan received his PhD from La Sapienza, Rome, under the supervision of Pierluigi Crescenzi. After postdoctoral studies at the Massachusetts Institute of Technology and DIMACS, he held an assistant professor position at Columbia University before moving to the University of California, Berkeley and then, in 2010, to Stanford.  In 2014 he returned to Berkeley, and in 2019 he moved to the Department of Decision Sciences at Bocconi University.

Recognition
Trevisan won the Danny Lewin Best Student Paper Award at the 1997 Symposium on Theory of Computing, the Oberwolfach Prize in 2000, and a Sloan Fellowship also in 2000. He was an invited speaker at the 2006 International Congress of Mathematicians in Madrid. He was an Erdős Lecturer at Hebrew University of Jerusalem in 2012.

Personal life
Trevisan came out as openly gay in 2000, and in 2012 he organized a collection of testimonials by homosexual theoretical computer scientists on their experiences in the research community.

References

External links
List of Publications
in theory, Trevisan's blog

Living people
Columbia University faculty
Stanford University School of Engineering faculty
Theoretical computer scientists
Italian LGBT scientists
Italian gay men
Italian emigrants to the United States
UC Berkeley College of Engineering faculty
Science bloggers
Sapienza University of Rome alumni
Sloan Research Fellows
1971 births
Gay academics
Gay scientists